Agia Theodoti is a settlement on the island Ios in the regional unit of Thira, in the region of South Aegean, according to the Kallikratis reform. Prior to the Kallikratis and the Kapodistrias reforms, it belonged to the province of Thira in the prefecture of Cyclades, in the geographical group of Aegean Islands.

General information 
Agia Theodoti is a seaside settlement NE. Ios, in the middle of the Gulf of Agia Theodoti, at an altitude of twenty meters. It is 10 km NE of the Town of Chora. It was named after the church of the same name in the location. In 1967 the settlement first acquired a telephone service. In the past years, the settlement was connected to the capital of the island through a path that the inhabitants traveled either on foot or using animals. The settlement was recognized in 1971 and added to the community of Ios. In 1978 a street-opening was created with private funding, while its asphalt was put in place in 1998. In the wider region, iron mines were in operation. Starting with the 1980s, Agia Theodoti experienced significant tourist development.

The local homonymous church of the settlement is celebrated on 8 September.

Sights 
In Agia Theodoti there is the homonymous church, which was built about 500 years ago on the ruins of an ancient temple and was originally intended for the worship needs of the Roman Catholics of the island. This particular church is also known as Panagia to Genesio (Παναγιά το Γενέσιο). Another attraction is the remnants of an ancient aqueduct.

References

Populated places in Ios